Lucio "Lou" Sticca (born 2 June 1960 in Melbourne) is an Australian football agent and businessman. He also holds Italian citizenship.

Sticca started off in football in 1997 as founder and CEO of Carlton Soccer Club in the National Soccer League. Sticca moved into player agency in 2000, founding Tribal Sports Management.

Carlton Soccer Club
Sticca founded and managed the inception of the Carlton Soccer Club in 1997 into the Australian national football competition, where the team he built reached the grand final in their inaugural season.

Sticca made international headlines when as CEO of Carlton SC he threatened to sue Andy Cole and Manchester United for the tackle that smashed Carlton and Socceroo star Simon Colosimo's knee.

Tribal Sports Group 
In 2000, Sticca started agency business TSM. Sticca obtained his FIFA accreditation as a Licensed Player Agent. In 2005, Sticca obtained his second accreditation as a FIFA Licensed Match Agent. In 2014 Tribal Sports Group PL was founded and operates three main divisions Tribal Sports Management PL (player management), Tribal Sports Entertainment PL (events and tours including Money in Sport Conferences) and Tribal Marketing and Media. Other significant stakeholders in Tribal Sports Group include Walter Bugno, resident of Monaco and President and CEO of global gaming giant Gtech.

Sydney F.C. 

After being contracted by his good friend Walter Bugno who was the inaugural Chairman of Sydney FC, Sticca was charged with putting together a football department in the space of 5 months for the start of the 2005 Hyundai A-League season. Sticca recruited former German World Cup winner Pierre Littbarski as head coach and former Tottenham and Norwich midfielder Ian Crook as assistant coach. The initial 22-man roster Sticca recruited included many ex-NSL players, Australian youngsters such as Mark Milligan, returning Socceroos including Steve Corica, Mark Rudan, Sasho Petrovski and David Zdrilic. The coup of the inaugural season was the recruitment of former Manchester United hero Dwight Yorke.

In 2012 Sticca secured one of the biggest names ever to come to play in Australian soccer when he recruited Italian World Cup winner and Juventus captain, Alessandro Del Piero to Sydney FC. Del Piero went on to have a magnificent season with the 38-year-old veteran scoring 14 goals and thrilling packed houses in every City in Australia.

Western Sydney Wanderers

Not long after Del Piero signed for Sydney FC, Sticca secured Japanese World Cup star Shinji Ono as the marquee player for the new Western Sydney Wanderers franchise.

References

1960 births
Living people
Australian sports agents